Brockton Station was an American research (weather) station in Antarctica. It was built by the Seabees and operated by the US Navy during the summer months from October 1965 to February 1972.

See also
 List of Antarctic field camps
Byrd Station
Dean Cullom Smith
Ellsworth Station
Framheim
Hallett Station
List of Antarctic expeditions
McMurdo Station
Operation Deep Freeze
Palmer Station
Plateau Station
 List of Antarctic research stations
Siple Station
South Pole Station

References

Outposts of Antarctica
Outposts of the Ross Dependency
1965 establishments in Antarctica
1972 disestablishments in Antarctica